Gerald Gansterer (born 29 October 1982) is an Austrian footballer who currently plays for Austrian team FC Pasching.

References
Player profile - LASK
 Player profile - Austria Archiv
 Guardian football

1982 births
Living people
Sportspeople from Wiener Neustadt
Footballers from Lower Austria
Austrian footballers
LASK players
Kapfenberger SV players

Association football defenders